Kildun Standing Stones are standing stones, forming a National Monument, located in County Mayo, Ireland.

Location
Unusually for the area, they are on an east-facing slope and Achill Island is not visible from the site.

History
The standing stones were erected perhaps in the Bronze Age. The "cross pillar" was later Christianised by having a cross pattée carved in a circle on the west face.

Description

Cross pillar

Stone
An undecorated standing stone.

References

National Monuments in County Mayo
Archaeological sites in County Mayo